X. silvestrii may refer to:
 Xyletobius silvestrii, a beetle species
 Xysticus silvestrii, Simon, 1905, a crab spider species in the genus Xysticus  found in Argentina

See also
 Silvestrii (disambiguation)